WKHQ-FM (105.9 MHz) is a 100,000-watt radio station licensed to Charlevoix, Michigan, with studios located on U.S. 131 South Petoskey, Michigan and US 31 Acme, Michigan. The Top 40 (CHR) station is known to listeners as  Hits 106 KHQ, Northern Michigan's #1 Hit Music Channel.

WVOY
The station signed on in 1980, but its roots can be traced back to the early 1970s, with the beginning of WVOY, a 5,000-watt daytime-only station at 1270 kHz on the AM dial.  WVOY was one of the first all-contemporary-hit-music radio stations in northern Michigan and featured Bill Vogel ("The Captain," formerly of Detroit's WDRQ), John Yaroch, Rick Durkin, and other major-market-quality talent.

Despite WVOY's limited signal, the station became extremely popular and gave northern Michigan listeners a taste of the "big city" radio sound.  The station was live during morning and afternoon drive (with Vogel and Yaroch), and "live assist" automation using ITC ("The Cart Machine People") "carousels" and carted music during other time periods.

WKHQ Signs On
After many years of expensive and time-consuming legal wrangling over a hotly contested 100 kW FM license (mostly with religious broadcast proponent Roland Cilke), the station's owners, Tim Ives and Elmo Franklin, sold an interest to former WVOY salesperson and air talent Tim Moore, who had worked with TM Programming Broadcast consultants in the interim since his departure from WVOY in the mid-1970s. Moore later purchased the interests of Ives and Franklin at a pre-arranged contract price. Tim went on to buy stations in Florida. Today Moore is the principal of Audience Development Group, a large programming consulting firm working with stations coast to coast.

The call letters Moore chose were WKHQ, named after a legendary Spokane, Washington radio and TV combo, KHQ. The station signed on May 8, 1980, using TM Programming's "Stereo Rock" format, developed by George Burns and programmed by Bob Harper.  106/KHQ quickly shot up to the top of the ratings thanks to its polished jocks and pitch-perfect upbeat music.  In its early years, WKHQ was known as "The Rhythm of the Northwest" (referring, of course, to northwestern Michigan), and its TM "Stereo Rock" jingles used that slogan.  WVOY, in the meantime, flipped to a Music of Your Life format, although the station would return to simulcasting the FM later in the 1980s as WKHQ.  The station is now WMKT, "News/Talk 1270."

Moore sold the station in the mid-1980s to Midwest Family, only to recover it a few years later. He sold it again to Cadillac Media who also ended up having financial problems, and again became the owner. Midwest then sold to MacDonald Broadcasting in 1994.

WKHQ vs. WKPK
In 1994, KHQ and 1270, now Talk station WMKT, was sold to Trish MacDonald-Garber, who owned WMBN 1340 and WLXT 96.3, a.k.a. Lite 96. With the ownership change, MacDonald-Garber transitioned KHQ to more of a Hot AC, causing rival 106.7 The Peak to boost their teenage audience even further. KHQ's liners would blast The Peak for being "the rap station", while The Peak's liners would blast KHQ for being too corny. As a result, by the late 1990s, KHQ would be a full-blown CHR again, but in the interim, WKPK became the dominant CHR signal and the #1 station in most areas that KHQ had once "owned".

In 2000, 106.7 The Peak flipped to Hot AC, leaving KHQ all to itself in the CHR arena. With the format all to itself, KHQ again ventured into Adult CHR territory, with only a limited number of rap tracks.

The station's most-recognized personality was long-running morning man Bill "The Captain" Vogel, who hosted the station's morning show from 1983 to 2001 (and had worked at KHQ's predecessor, WVOY-AM, before that). While at KHQ, Vogel was known for his on-air signature catchphrase "Get the heck outta bed!".  Vogel left KHQ in 2001 to focus on being a talk radio host on the Michigan Talk Radio Network (MTRN), only to quit due to the network's money troubles. He owned a successful voice-over business, where he produced network spots for CBS and was the announcer for the FOX sketch comedy show Mad TV. Vogel passed away on March 27, 2021 after a long battle with cancer. Original line-up in 1980: Tim Moore-mornings; Mike Daniels-middays; Bob Harper-Operations Mgr. and afternoons; Carey Carlson-nights; John Borders-voice tracked 10p-6a; Bob White-morning news; Cindy Smith-afternoon news. Other personalities in the 1980s: Rob Hazelton, Jim Owen, Chet Jessick, Mark Cage, Mike Sommers and Christopher Knight.In KHQ's first Arbitron Ratings sweep, it was number one across the board and never looked back until Moore and partner Ernie Winn sold the station in 1990. KHQ received visitations from stations from WPLJ New York to 91X San Diego during Moore's first 5 years of ownership. That led to Moore's programming consultancy, which became Audience Development Group.

The departure of the Captain would be the start of many defections by high-profile personalities, including "Storm" Kennedy, Keith Michaels, Lisa Knight, and Ron Pritchard, who programmed the station for most of the late 1990s through the mid-2000s.

WKHQ Today
Today, WKHQ is still Northern Michigan's #1 rated CHR station 

Current voice over talent is Chad Erickson, who replaced Randy Cox in April 2019. Randy Cox was the voice talent of the station after the passing of longtime voice artist Brian James.

Current on-air line up includes Mornings 6a–10a am Robby and Rochelle (previously at WDVD Detroit, WSHK, WSAK New Hampshire) 10-2p Rochelle,  2p-7p Fish (Formerly WJZJ, WKHQ Nights) is now on afternoons and Tyler Woods is 7pm to Midnight.
 On weekends, WKHQ airs Hollywood Hamilton's Weekend Top 30 and Remix Top 30, and the Hot AC version of American Top 40 with Ryan Seacrest.

Robby Bridges was named Vice President Of Programming for MacDonald/Garber Broadcasting in 2020.

Jingles
WKHQ used two jingle packages from JAM Creative Productions (Skywave and Breakthrough) with a HLC package prior to its switch to JAM. However, on  May 17, 2009 the station began to use ReelWorld One CHR with the Kiss L.A logo.

In January 2013, WKHQ revamped its image completely, dropping jingles all together in favor of using sweepers and liners.

April 2019 saw the return of Jingles to the station, again utilizing the Kiss LA Logo from Reelworld.

Competition

WKHQ competes with Z-93 WJZQ, the market's only other CHR station.

References

Sources 
 Michiguide.com - WKHQ History
http://www.allaccess.com All Access - Industry Directory
http://www.106khq.com
https://www.linkedin.com/public-profile/in/robbybridges?challengeId=AQEjJHJjxT3EhQAAAXeqlcPFgKe9D7JFFJaet8VjHgicWrA36BD3J6oLwiCrWqIlJnOoKHRogU3nBZD2Yql8tTcrR3YnSfvahw&submissionId=627edba7-ab36-6416-ebdd-30ad7fe77471

External links
article - “Is there life after ownership?”

Radio and Records Magazine

Dec 4, 1981
 https://worldradiohistory.com/hd2/IDX-Business/Music/Archive-RandR-IDX/IDX/80s/81/RR-1981-12-04-OCR-Page-0016.pdf#search=%22wkhq%22

KHQ-FM
Contemporary hit radio stations in the United States
Radio stations established in 1980